Oda Slobodskaya (28 November/10 December 1888 – 30 July 1970) was a Russian soprano who became a British citizen.

Early life
Her biographer Maurice Leonard quotes Slobodskaya as having been born on 28 November 1888 in Vilno (now Vilnius). She won a scholarship for secondary education but, having completed her schooling, to her displeasure, found herself working with her parents in a secondhand clothes shop. Knowing she had a good voice, in 1907 she applied for an audition at the Saint Petersburg Conservatory. Having no classical repertoire she sang the simple songs she had learned as a child. Despite this lack of sophistication, her vocal potential was immediately apparent. The Director, Glazunov, and Natalya Iretskaya (the most important Russian singing tutor and herself a pupil of Pauline Viardot) accepted her and awarded her a scholarship for nine years' study.

The Mariinsky Theatre
In 1916 she made her debut, as Lisa in Tchaikovsky's The Queen of Spades the Mariinsky Theatre. She sang with the company for the next five years and performed many of the principal soprano parts of the Russian repertory as well as Sieglinde, Marguerite in Faust, Elisabeth de Valois, and Aida. The revolution having broken out, she was ordered to join other singers on obligatory tours to factories and farms to entertain the workers and there met the bass Fyodor Chaliapin.

To Berlin
In 1921 she fled from Russia to Berlin where she was soon invited to sing. Success there brought a call from Diaghilev to join him in Paris to star in the premiere of Stravinsky's opera Mavra in 1922. Chaliapin then invited her to be principal soprano in the company he was forming to tour Western Europe and she sang with him in Paris.

To America
The impresario Rabinoff organised for her to tour America as star soloist with The Ukrainian Chorus and while there she made a successful solo debut at Carnegie Hall in New York. But, as a displaced Russian living abroad when appreciation of the Russian repertoire was minimal, Slobodskaya had difficulty finding a good manager. To augment her classical career, she created a parallel identity in vaudeville, singing operatic arias and good quality ballads under the pseudonym "Odali Careno". She remained in the USA for nearly seven years.

To England
In 1930 she was booked, as Odali Careno, for two weeks at the London Palladium. Always performing to her own exacting standards, she had a great success, was immediately re-engaged, and was later twice invited to star in Royal Command Performances before King George V and Queen Mary. She also re-established her classical career, appearing at the Lyceum with Chaliapin as Natasha in Alexander Dargomïzhsky's Rusalka. In 1932, following her marriage to Captain Raymond Pelly, England became her permanent home.

Covent Garden debut
The same year (1932) she made her Covent Garden debut as Fevronia in a concert performance of Rimsky-Korsakov's Legend of the Invisible City of Kitezh, and as Venus in Tannhauser with Sir Thomas Beecham. She again sang Fevroniya, in Italian, at La Scala, Milan in 1933, and sang Palmyra in Thomas Beecham's production of Frederick Delius's Koanga at Covent Garden in 1935. In 1936 she took part in a Russian season at the Teatro Colón, Buenos Aires and sang Khivrya in Modest Moussorgsky's Fair at Sorochintsï at the Savoy and on an English tour in 1941 and subsequent years.

Work for the BBC
Throughout the 1930s she was much in demand by the BBC for concert performances of opera (notably as the heroine of Dmitry Shostakovich's Lady Macbeth of the Mtsensk District) and for recitals of Russian song. A regular performer in the Promenade concerts, she also recorded Russian art songs including many by pianist/composer Nicolas Medtner. There followed wartime entertainment work and participation in the National Gallery Concerts of Myra Hess.

Records
After the war, during which her husband had died, Slobodskaya's career was much reduced, though she  made her only movie appearance as a Prima Donna in the 1951 film The Magic Box. She rekindled her concert career with some highly acclaimed recitals in the Wigmore Hall. Saga records "rediscovered" her in the late 1950s and released two LP records. These records prompted Decca to recall that they had several unissued Slobodskaya recordings from 1939–1945 which included the definitive performance of "Tatiana's letter Scene" from Eugene Onegin. These were released in 1961 together with some newly recorded items. The Shostakovitch Six Spanish Songs, Kabalevsky Seven Nursery Rhymes, a fine set of Polish songs and an LP of classical Russian art and folk songs also followed.
In 1974 SAGA released a record (numbered SAGA 5357) on which Slobodskaya sings songs by Mussorgsky, accompanied on piano by Ivor Newton.

Tributes
Slobodskaya had a voice of immense purity, steadiness, agility and expressiveness with an almost incandescent quality above the stave. As a recitalist, she possessed the imagination and vivid temperament to convey to an audience ignorant of Russian the precise mood of each song, whether elegiac, boisterous, satirical or childlike. As her many recordings reveal, these rare interpretative powers were matched by a beautiful and ample voice of characteristically Slavonic colour and by a technical mastery which showed itself especially in supple and sustained legato phrasing. She retained her vocal and interpretative powers to an advanced age.

Slobodskaya had a rich, strongly accented speaking voice and a characterful turn of phrase, and liked to give spoken introductions to her songs. This led to one of her last, great successes, in the speaking role of Narrator in "Peter and the Wolf", recording date unknown and released on Fidelio records in 1964 with the Colonne Concerts Orchestra under Isaie Disenhaus.

She was a much admired Professor of Singing at the Royal College of Music and the Guildhall School of Music, where her pupils included sopranos Patricia Reakes and Yvonne Fuller and contraltos Anne Collins and Annette Thompson, and, until her very last year, continued to give recitals of Russian song.  She died in London, aged 81, on 30 July 1970.

Filmography
The Magic Box (1951)

References

Sources

External links

1888 births
1970 deaths
Musicians from Vilnius
Russian operatic sopranos
Saint Petersburg Conservatory alumni
Voice teachers
Women music educators
Russian Jews
Naturalised citizens of the United Kingdom
White Russian emigrants to the United Kingdom
White Russian emigrants to the United States
White Russian emigrants to Germany
Academics of the Guildhall School of Music and Drama
Academics of the Royal College of Music
20th-century Russian women opera singers
Soviet women opera singers